, often referred to as just Nipponzan Myohoji or the Japan Buddha Sangha, is a Japanese new religious movement and activist group founded in 1917 by Nichidatsu Fujii, emerging from Nichiren Buddhism. "Nipponzan Myōhōji is a small Nichiren Buddhist order of about 1500 persons, including both monastics and lay persons." The community reveres the Lotus Sutra as the highest expression of the Buddhist message.

In addition, it is actively engaged worldwide in the peace movement. It is the most pacifist group in Japan of seven religious movements surveyed by Robert Kisala. The main practice of Nichiren Buddhism is to chant Namu Myōhō Renge Kyō. Nipponzan-Myōhōji monks, nuns and followers beat hand drums while chanting the Daimoku, and walk throughout the world promoting peace and non-violence. They try to explain the meaning of their ministry to all wishing to understand it.

Peace pagodas and pilgrimages

 
The most recognizable achievement of Nipponzan-Myōhōji is peace pagodas (stupas), that have been erected in various locations around the world, the first of which was inaugurated in 1954 at Kumamoto in Japan. Since then cities such as London, New Delhi, Vienna, Comiso (in Italy) and Tokyo have all received peace pagodas.

In 1985 the first peace pagoda in the United States was completed, the New England Peace Pagoda in Leverett, Massachusetts. The second US pagoda was built in 1993. There are currently three peace pagodas in the United States, and as of April 2022 there are plans for a fourth. 

Followers of the order have also undertaken numerous peace pilgrimages. One of the most prominent of these was the 1994–1995 The Interfaith Pilgrimage for Peace and Life from Auschwitz to Hiroshima, by way of Bosnia, Iraq, Cambodia, and other countries experiencing the effects of war. In 2010, they participated in the Walk for a Nuclear Free Future across the United States.

Many argue that the order shows a certain political stance with its active opposition to the nuclear industry in Japan and U.S. involvement in Okinawa. This has led to a difference in views with fellow Nichiren sect Soka Gakkai, who are often viewed as more conservative.

See also 
 Junsei Terasawa
 Pan'kivka. Peace Pagoda Building

References

External links

 United Nations Department of Public Information Non-Governmental Organization Entry for Nipponzan Myōhōji organization
 Peace Abbey awards Nipponzan-Myohoji the Courage of Conscience Award #71

New religious movements
Nichiren Buddhism
Religious organizations based in Japan
Japanese new religions